Michael Joseph Crombeen (born April 16, 1957) is a Canadian former professional ice hockey player, who played in eight seasons in the National Hockey League (NHL). His son B. J. also played in the NHL.

Playing career
Crombeen was born in Sarnia, Ontario. As a youth, he played in the 1969 Quebec International Pee-Wee Hockey Tournament with a minor ice hockey team from Sarnia. He played his junior hockey with the Kingston Canadians of the OHA from 1973–1977, playing in 244 games, while getting 322 points (160 goals-162 assists).  His best season was 1974–75, when he earned 114 points (56G-58A) in 69 games.  In 19 career playoff games, he earned 21 points (8G-13A). Crombeen was drafted by the Cleveland Barons with the 5th overall pick in the 1977 NHL amateur draft, and was also selected by the Edmonton Oilers with the 4th overall pick in the 1977 WHA Amateur Draft.  Crombeen elected to join the Barons.

Crombeen split the 1977–78 season between the minors and the NHL, playing with the Salt Lake Golden Eagles of the CHL, getting 8 points (4G-4A) in 12 games, and the Binghamton Dusters of the AHL, getting 3 points (1G-2A) in 13 games, along with 48 games with the Cleveland Barons, scoring 7 points (3G-4A).  As the Barons franchise folded and many of their players were absorbed by the Minnesota North Stars, Crombeen found himself left unprotected, and was picked up by the St. Louis Blues in the dispersal draft.

Crombeen then started the 1978–79 season with the Golden Eagles, scoring 15 points (6G-9A) in 30 games, before joining the St. Louis Blues for 37 games, getting 11 points (3G-8A).

In 1979–80, Crombeen spent the entire season with the Blues, getting 22 points (10G-12A) in 71 games, and appeared in his first NHL playoffs, going pointless in 2 games.  Crombeen then registered 23 points (9G-14A) in 69 games in 1980–81, and chipped in with 3 goals in 11 playoff games, including a goal in double overtime that clinched the Blues' first-round series against the Pittsburgh Penguins.  1981–82 was the most productive season of Crombeen's career, getting a career high 27 points (19G-8A) in 71 games, and earned 4 points (3G-1A) in 10 playoff games.  He played in all 80 games in the 1982–83 season, getting 17 points (6G-11A), then earned an assist in 4 playoff games.  On October 3, 1983, the Hartford Whalers picked up Crombeen off of waivers.

Crombeen spent the 1983–84 season with the Whalers, getting 5 points (1G-4A) in 56 games, then split the 1984–85 season with Hartford, getting 11 points (4G-7A) in 46 games, and with the Binghamton Whalers of the AHL, earning 3 points (2G-1A) in 6 games.  After the season, Crombeen announced his retirement from hockey.

Personal
His son, B.J. Crombeen, has played 445 NHL games with four teams.

Career statistics

Regular season and playoffs

Awards
1976, 1977: OMJHL Second All-Star Team

References

External links

1957 births
Binghamton Dusters players
Binghamton Whalers players
Canadian ice hockey forwards
Cleveland Barons (NHL) draft picks
Cleveland Barons (NHL) players
Edmonton Oilers (WHA) draft picks
Hartford Whalers players
Ice hockey people from Ontario
Kingston Canadians players
Living people
National Hockey League first-round draft picks
St. Louis Blues players
Salt Lake Golden Eagles (CHL) players
Sportspeople from Sarnia
World Hockey Association first round draft picks
Canadian expatriate ice hockey players in the United States